Gerhard Rode (d. in 1320) – vogt or komtur of Sambia.

In July 1320, he took part in the attack on samogitian Medininkai. In the battle, he was captured into slavery. He was burned as a sacrifice to the gods with a horse attached to him.

Notes 

1320 deaths
People executed by burning
People from the State of the Teutonic Order
Year of birth unknown